Whispering Corridors (also known as Ghost School and Ghost School Horror) is a South Korean supernatural horror film series. The series uses an all-girls high school as the backdrop for each of its films. Every Whispering Corridors film features a different plot, characters and settings. The series is notable for helping generate the explosion of the New Korean Wave cinematic movement, and dealing with taboo topics such as authoritarianism in the harsh South Korean education system, gay relationships and teen suicide, following the liberalization of censorship.

History 
In the late '90s, screenwriter Oh Ki-min had written the screenplay for Whispering Corridors and showed it to various production companies, but the film was rejected by all of them. Meanwhile, producer Lee Choon-yun became aware of a Japanese horror film set in a school (Gakkō no Kaidan) and thought this type of horror film might work well in Korea. Since many Korean schools have urban legends tied to them, Choon-yun intended to produce a contemporary film version of the scary stories adapted from school legends. Choon-yun stated that another thing that motivated him was his antagonism toward the harsh South Korean education system. The producer thought that an all-girls high school was an attractive setting, stating that "It's a space that stimulates male curiosity, a place that men have never been in but are fascinated by. Conversely, for women, it's an environment that they can feel nostalgic about."

The film became a big commercial success, which led to several sequels. The films don't share any direct links with each other, due to the producer wanting Whispering Corridors to be a "brand name".

Films

Whispering Corridors (1998)

In an exclusive all-girls school, a former pupil returns to start a new job as a teacher and strikes up a friendship with two very different students. But when a teacher is found dead, apparently having committed suicide, circumstances that link the past and the present begin to unveil themselves. As the body count rises, the memories of past deaths begin to call forth a series of ghosts to haunt the corridors of this troubled school.

Memento Mori (1999)

Min-Ah spots a maroon diary near a water fountain at school. She's late for class and takes the diary with her. In class, Min-Ah opens the diary and experiences a brief hallucinatory experience. The diary originally belonged to two girls that attend the same school, Hyo-Shin and Si-Eun. The two girls seem to share a relationship that's closer than even best friends. As Min-Ah becomes immersed in their world, a suicide occurs at school. Hyo-Shin leaps to her death from the roof a school building. Soon, Hyo-Shin's spirit unleashes unbridle terror upon her former school.

Wishing Stairs (2003)

Two young beautiful friends, Jin-Sung and So-Hee, have forged a "close" relationship, but this is challenged when the ballet school holds its annual competition to see who will go forward to the national competition and win a scholarship to a Russian ballet school. The better of the two friends, So-Hee looks all set to win, when it becomes apparent that Jin-Sung is becoming more and more jealous. She then bumps into Hae-Ju, a former fat girl who stuffed her face all day and appeared quite mad, who reveals that she is now thin because of the wishing stairs and the synonymous appearance of the 29th step. Jin-Sung then decides to give the stairs a go herself. When the 29th step appears she wishes that she could be the one who wins the ballet scholarship. When So-Hee falls down a flight of stairs and becomes crippled, she commits suicide by jumping from her hospital window. With So-Hee gone, Jin-Sung wins the ballet competition. Hae-Ju goes back to the wishing stairs and asks for one more wish.

Voice (2005)

This installment follows the story of Young-Eun, a timid high school student who dies mysteriously while singing in the school's music room. But even in death, Young-Eun's voice continues to be heard by her best friend, Sun-Min. Although startled by this supernatural development, Sun-Min adapts rather quickly to the situation and tries to uncover the reasons for her friend's untimely demise. But Sun-Min's absolute faith in her dearly departed friend is soon shaken when a plague of mysterious deaths start to occur on campus! Are these murders Young-Eun's doing? Or could the culprit be someone far more sinister?

A Blood Pledge (2009)

After her sister Eun-ju (Kyeong-ah Jang) commits suicide by jumping from the roof of her school building, Jeong-eun (Shin-ae Yu) chooses to investigate the unexpected incident further. Speaking to three of her sister's friends she is told that the four girls had previously made a suicide pact and that Eun-ju was the only one to fully commit. But now that the other girls have abandoned their friend and cheated the pledge, Eun-ju has come back from beyond the grave to make them pay.

The Humming (2021)
Strange things happen in the closed toilets of Eun-Hee's old high school, where she was work as the vice-principal and she has lost her memories of her high school students days. Meanwhile, Ha-Young who is a victim of school bullying, but she is driven into a trouble maker at the school. One day, Ha-Young going to a closed bathroom at the school and she hears a ghost’s whisper that echoing in the toilet, Ha-Young believes the mystery is linked to Eun-Hee, and after being accused, Eun-Hee suffers from visual and auditory hallucinations. She is also convinced that she was called there after seeing female students with injured faces all over her old school. Eun-Hee and Ha-Young are aware the weird happenings at the school is related to the closed bathroom.

References 

South Korean horror films
South Korean film series
Horror film series
South Korean high school films
South Korean ghost films
South Korean supernatural horror films
Korean-language films